The 2016 Florida Democratic presidential primary took place on March 15 in the U.S. state of Florida as one of the Democratic Party's primaries ahead of the 2016 presidential election.

On the same day, the Democratic Party held primaries in Illinois, Missouri, North Carolina and Ohio, while the Republican Party held primaries in the same five states, including their own Florida primary, plus the Northern Mariana Islands.

Clinton's landslide was fueled by support from retirees, and Jewish and Latino voters in South Florida.

Debates and forums

March 2016 debate in Miami

On March 9, 2016, the Democratic Party held an eighth presidential debate at Miami Dade College in Miami, Florida. It was broadcast through a partnership between Univision and The Washington Post.

Opinion polling

Results

Results by district

Results by county

Analysis 
Florida was generally viewed as a state Hillary Clinton would win, given her strong performance in previous contests with older voters (who comprised 65% of the Democratic electorate in Florida, the largest in any contest) and non-white voters (who made up 52% of the electorate). Clinton won the Florida Primary by 31 points, winning older voters by a margin of 71–26, and non-white voters by a margin of 74–25. Specifically, she won Hispanic/Latino voters by a margin of 68-32 (who made up 20% of the electorate), and African American voters 81-18 (who comprised 27% of the electorate). Clinton also won white voters by a narrower margin of 53–43. She won across all income and educational attainment levels. 

In terms of religious affiliation, Clinton won Protestants in Florida 69-29 (36% of the electorate), Catholics 69-29 (22% of the electorate), and other religious affiliations 68-31 (Jews were 4% of the electorate but were unaccounted for in exit polls). Sanders won voters who identified as agnostic/atheist 56–31. In terms of political ideology, Clinton won liberals 59-41 and moderates/conservatives 70–26. And while Clinton won Democrats 71–28, Sanders won self-identified Independents 55–41.

Clinton won in Miami and along the Gold Coast 73–26, where there is a larger population of Hispanic/Latino voters who in South Florida are predominantly of Cuban or Nicaraguan descent. Clinton also won the Gulf Coast and Mid-Florida 64–35, the Tampa Bay Area 63–37, the Orlando area 62–34, and the Northern Panhandle which is whiter, more conservative and more rural by a smaller margin of 58–37.

References

Florida
Democratic primary
2016
March 2016 events in the United States